Andriy Mykolayovich Kotelnyk (born 29 December 1977), best known by the Germanicised name Andreas Kotelnik, is a Ukrainian former professional boxer who competed between 2000 and 2014, and held the WBA super-lightweight title from 2008 to 2009. As an amateur boxer, he won a silver medal in the lightweight division at the 2000 Olympics.

Amateur career
 1995 won the Junior European Championship in Siofok, Hungary as a flyweight
 1997 competed as a Featherweight at the World Championships in Budapest, Hungary. Results were:
Defeated Kenneth Buhlalu (South-Africa) PTS
Defeated Roman Rafael (Slovakia) WO
Lost to Falk Huste (Germany) PTS
 2000 won the silver medal as a Lightweight at the Sydney Olympics. Results were:
Defeated Larry Semillano (Philippines) RSCO 4
Defeated Raymond Narh (Ghana) PTS (17:11)
Defeated Nurzhan Karimzhanov (Kazakhstan) RSCO 3
Defeated Cristian Bejarano (Mexico) PTS (22:14)
Lost to Mario Kindelan (Cuba) PTS (4:14)

Professional career
Kotelnik made his professional debut on 16 December 2000, scoring a first-round knockout against Peter Feher. On 24 January 2003, Kotelnik won his first regional championship—the vacant WBA Inter-Continental light-welterweight title—following a unanimous decision (UD) over Fabrice Colombel. He defended this title twice before a career first loss on 21 October 2004, a split decision (SD) against Souleymane M'baye. On 9 July 2005, Kotelnik challenged European light-welterweight champion Junior Witter, but lost via UD. In his next fight, on 26 November 2005, Kotelnik defeated Muhammad Abdullaev via UD to win back the vacant WBA Inter-Continental light-welterweight title, as well as the vacant WBO Asia Pacific light-welterweight title.

A rematch against M'baye on 30 March 2007, this time with M'baye's WBA light-welterweight world title on the line, ended in a split draw. Almost exactly a year later, on 22 March 2008, Kotelnik won the aforementioned WBA world title—now held by Gavin Rees—by stopping the champion in the twelfth and final round. Two successful defences were made: a UD against Norio Kimura on 13 September 2008, and a close SD against future world champion Marcos Maidana on 7 February 2009. In his third defence, Kotelnik lost the title to Amir Khan after a clear UD. After more than a year of inactivity, he returned on 7 August 2010 to face unified WBC and IBF light-welterweight champion Devon Alexander, but lost a UD which was widely viewed as controversial and a "robbery".

Having spent more than four years out of the sport, Kotelnik had a farewell fight on 4 October 2014, winning a dominant eight-round UD over Alexander Benidze.

Professional boxing record

References

External links
 (history)

1977 births
Olympic boxers of Ukraine
Boxers at the 2000 Summer Olympics
Living people
Olympic silver medalists for Ukraine
World Boxing Association champions
Olympic medalists in boxing
Sportspeople from Lviv
Ukrainian male boxers
World light-welterweight boxing champions
Medalists at the 2000 Summer Olympics
Lightweight boxers